Derrick Ford (born February 28, 1979, Long Beach, California) is a former defensive end for the Ottawa Renegades, Saskatchewan Roughriders, and Calgary Stampeders of the Canadian Football League.

Career
He played college football at Arizona State University. He was signed as an undrafted free agent by the Ottawa Renegades. 
During his time in Ottawa he not only led the team in sacks but became their all-time sack leader in only two years. After the success in the CFL, he signed to play with NFL Europa's Rhein Fire. Then he played in the AF2 with the Stockton Lightning.  Recently Ford played in Finland, in the Vaahteraliiga with the Porvoo Butchers. He is currently playing with the Kiel Baltic Hurricanes in the German Football League.

References

External links
 CBC.ca
 Artiles.latimes.com
 Nytimes.com
 Sportsnetwork.com
 CBC.ca
 Stocktonlightning.com

1979 births
Living people
American players of Canadian football
Players of American football from Long Beach, California
Players of Canadian football from Long Beach, California
American football defensive ends
Arizona State Sun Devils football players
Ottawa Renegades players
Saskatchewan Roughriders players
Calgary Stampeders players
Rhein Fire players